Anthony 'Tony' Derrick Simmons (born 6 October 1948) is a male former athlete.

Athletics career
Simmons represented England in the 1974 British Commonwealth Games, in Christchurch, New Zealand finishing seventh in the 10,000 metres. Four years later he represented his birth country (Wales) in the 5,000 metres and 10,000 metres events, at the 1978 Commonwealth Games in Edmonton, Alberta, Canada, finishing sixth in the 10,000 metres and seventh in the 5,000 metres.

He won the silver medal in the 10,000 metres at the 1974 European Athletics Championships, finishing 4 hundredths of a second behind the gold medallist. In the 1976 Summer Olympics he qualified for the finals of the 10,000 metres, finishing 4th. He set a world best for the half-marathon at Welwyn Garden City, England on 24 June 1978 of 62 minutes 47 seconds. The mark stood for nearly 16 months until eclipsed by Nick Rose.

Personal bests 

 1 mile: 4:03.1, 19 July 1967, Motspur Park, New Malden, London (British record as an 18 year old at the time)
 1500 metres: 3:41.1 min, 12 June 1977, Cwmbran
 2000 metres: 5:05.32 min, 4 July 1975, London
 3000 metres: 7:51.53 min, 23 August 1978, London
 5000 metres: 13:21.2 min, 23 May 1976, Kiev
 10,000 metres: 27:43.59 min, 30 June 1977, Helsinki
 Marathon: 2:12:33 h, 7 May 1978, Sandbach

References

 Tony Simmons at Sports-Reference.com
 Tony Simmons at The Power of Ten

Living people
1948 births
Sportspeople from Bridgend
Welsh male long-distance runners
English male marathon runners
Welsh male marathon runners
Olympic athletes of Great Britain
Athletes (track and field) at the 1976 Summer Olympics
European Athletics Championships medalists
Commonwealth Games competitors for England
Athletes (track and field) at the 1974 British Commonwealth Games
Commonwealth Games competitors for Wales
Athletes (track and field) at the 1978 Commonwealth Games